Henry Somerset-Scudamore, 3rd Duke of Beaufort (23 March 1707 – 26 February 1745), born Henry Somerset, was an English nobleman and peer who supported Jacobitism.

Life
He was the elder son of Henry Somerset, 2nd Duke of Beaufort and his second wife, Rachel Noel. As his father's eldest son and heir to his father's title he was known as (styled) Marquess of Worcester, a courtesy title. On his father's death on 24 April 1714, he succeeded him and became 3rd Duke of Beaufort.

At the age of 19 Beaufort commissioned the construction of what would later become known as the Badminton Chest or Badminton Cabinet, an ornate set of drawers made in Florence. The chest was sold in 2004 to Hans-Adam II, Prince of Liechtenstein for £19 million, making it the most expensive piece of furniture in the world. It is on display in the Palais Liechtenstein in Vienna, Austria.

The Duke was one of several founding governors of Britain's first institution for abandoned children, the Foundling Hospital, and his name is listed in its royal charter received from George II in October 1739.

In 1743, he was one of several leading English Tories who communicated with the French government through Francis Sempill in order to illicit French support for an invasion to restore the Stuart line.

After his death, the 3rd Duke of Beaufort was buried at St Michael and All Angels Church, Badminton. His memorial was sculpted by John Michael Rysbrack in 1754.

Because he had no legitimate children, his titles and estates were inherited by his younger brother, Charles Noel Somerset.

Family
On 28 June 1729 Beaufort married Frances Scudamore (14 August 1711 – 16 February 1750), the only daughter and heir of James Scudamore, 3rd Viscount Scudamore, and took his wife's name by an Act of Parliament later the same year.

In 1742 Beaufort filed for divorce over Frances's adulterous relationship with William Talbot, who later became Earl Talbot. Frances countersued, saying the Duke was impotent; in March 1743, he demonstrated before court-appointed examiners that he was physically able to have an erection. The divorce was granted, and he sued Talbot for damages.  Frances later remarried, to Charles FitzRoy-Scudamore.

Beaufort had one illegitimate daughter, Margaret Burr, who married the painter Thomas Gainsborough and had issue.

References

External links 
 the Badminton Cabinet in the Liechtenstein Museum, Vienna

1707 births
1745 deaths
103
11
English Jacobites
Masters of foxhounds in England
Henry Somerset, 3rd Duke of Beaufort
Henry